The Molecule Man (Owen Reece) is a character appearing in American comic books published by Marvel Comics. He first appeared in Fantastic Four #20 in November 1963 and was created by Stan Lee and Jack Kirby. He is often portrayed as a supervillain, but sometimes takes the role of a reformed outlaw or reluctant hero.

Publication history

The Molecule Man was created by Stan Lee and Jack Kirby, and first appeared in Fantastic Four #20.

Fictional character biography

1960s
Owen Reece was a timid child from Brooklyn, New York who obsessively clung to his mother. He grew into a weak-willed adult, made bitter and lonely by his mother's death, and full of fear and hatred of what he regarded as a deeply unfriendly world. Reece became a lowly laboratory technician working at a nuclear plant owned by the Acme Atomics Corporation. He was disgruntled by his job's long hours and low pay. One day, Reece accidentally activated an experimental particle generator, which bombarded him with an unknown form of radiation. The radiation had a mutagenic effect on Reece, releasing his potential for psionic powers on a cosmic scale. Reece could now control all matter, even down to the molecular level, and all energy. The radiation also left markings resembling lightning bolts across Reece's face. Reece named himself the "Molecule Man" after his power to control molecules.

The tremendous forces released by the accident also opened a wormhole between Earth's dimension and the dimension containing the immensely powerful entity later known as the Beyonder. During the following years, the Beyonder observed Earth and its multiverse through the interdimensional pinhole.

The day after the accident, the president of Acme Atomics fired Reece for his carelessness, not even knowing his name after his twelve years of work there. Angered, Molecule Man covered the president and his desk with ice that he formed from molecules in the air. Reece became a criminal and set out to use his powers to take revenge on a world he believed had belittled and persecuted him. However, Reece's self-doubt, fear, and self-hatred subconsciously restricted his powers. He believed he was unable to affect organic molecules, and that his power resided in a metal wand.

Uatu the Watcher recognized the threat that the Molecule Man posed and alerted the Fantastic Four. The Molecule Man easily defeated the Fantastic Four, forcing them to retreat. He created a glass barrier around Manhattan Island, saying the people would be trapped until the Fantastic Four were brought to him. Mister Fantastic, realizing Reece had only affected inorganic molecules, had Alicia Masters lure him to her apartment with the Fantastic Four flare. The Fantastic Four pretended to be statues by covering themselves with plaster. When Reece found himself unable to affect the statues, he dropped his wand in shock, allowing Mister Fantastic to grab it. The Watcher transported the Molecule Man to confinement in an other-dimensional world where time passed at an accelerated rate.

1970s
Believing himself unable to escape, Reece created a humanoid construct to serve as his companion and, through unknown means, endowed it with consciousness. Reece let the construct believe itself to be his son. Before dying, Reece transferred his consciousness and powers into the wand his son carried. Not bound by human limitations, the construct, known as the new Molecule Man, escaped to Earth. In an attempt to avenge his father, the new Molecule Man battled both the Man-Thing and the Thing of the Fantastic Four. Dependent on the metal wand to maintain his existence in this dimension, the new Molecule Man disintegrated when the wand was taken from him.

However, the consciousness and powers of the original Molecule Man remained within the wand, and Molecule Man could overpower the minds of whoever touched the wand and take control of their bodies. He took mental possession of Cynthia McClellan, and through her, battled Iron Man. Molecule Man then took mental possession of Aaron Stankey and Mister Fantastic.

1980s
The wand passed through the hands of a succession of holders until Reece's mind recreated his mutated body and transferred his consciousness and powers out of the wand and into the body. He threatened to destroy the world, but was persuaded by Tigra to give himself up and seek psychiatric help.

Reece did so, and soon began to change. He now had simple goals: true love, friendship, and a good home. However, Reece found himself sent to Battleworld, the planet created by the Beyonder, as part of the small army of criminal superhuman beings that were to engage in the first Secret War. Impressed by the charismatic dictator Doctor Doom, Reece agreed to help fight the superheroes also brought to Battleworld. During the course of the war, Reece and a superhuman called Volcana fell in love. Doctor Doom eventually succeeded in temporarily stealing the power of the Beyonder and transferring it into himself. Believing himself abandoned by Doctor Doom, Reece threatened to kill him. But Doctor Doom helped Reece break through his mental blocks and realize that his power was greater than he had believed. No longer angry at Doctor Doom, Reece transported himself, Volcana, and most of the criminals back to Earth. On Earth, Reece and Volcana began living together quietly in a Denver suburb, and Reece took a job as a worker in an atomic plant.

Months later, the Beyonder, again in possession of his full power, came to Earth in humanoid form seeking emotional fulfillment. When he failed, the Beyonder decided to rid himself of the problem by obliterating the multiverse. Reece attempted to save the universe by destroying the Beyonder, but the Beyonder's immense power far surpassed even Reece's own. Reece joined forces with many of Earth's superhuman champions to battle him. But the Molecule Man exhausted himself fighting the Beyonder, who unleashed an immensely powerful blast of energy to destroy Reece and his allies. The blast ripped open Earth's crust in the area of the Rocky Mountains, and would have caused incredible planet-wide instability if not for Molecule Man's power. Molecule Man used his power to shield himself and his allies, and to remove every living thing from the path of the blast to safety. As a result of his monumental efforts, Reece severely injured himself internally.

His foes appearing to have been defeated, the Beyonder proceeded with his new plan to find fulfillment by using a complex machine to transform himself into a mortal being with his full power. The machine drained the Beyonder's power into itself, transformed him into a mortal baby, and then began transferring the energy back into him. The infant would soon again become an adult. Molecule Man and his allies found the machine, and Reece, believing they could not take the chance that the newly reborn Beyonder would not someday destroy the multiverse, decided to kill him while he was vulnerable. Reece destroyed the machine, causing the infant's death, and diverted the Beyonder's immense power, which the machine released, through an interdimensional portal into the dimension from which the Beyonder had originally come. There the energy created a new universe.

The injured Molecule Man and the Silver Surfer, uniting their power temporarily, repaired all the damage done to the Earth, restoring the mountains and the part of the crust that the Beyonder had destroyed. Reece, believing that Earth's superhuman champions would always worry about his misusing them, pretended his powers had been burned out. Only Volcana and Silver Surfer know that Reece still has his powers. Reece lived quietly for a time with Rosenberg in their Denver suburb.

1990s
Reece was briefly merged with the Beyonder to take part in the creation of the complete Cosmic Cube being known as Kosmos. The Cube expelled him and he returned to Earth. He was then defeated in combat by Klaw, and separated from Volcana. The Molecule Man was later placed under the mental control of the Puppet Master. The Puppet Master used Reece to combat Aron the Rogue Watcher, but Aron defeated him. The now generally benevolent Reece accidentally releases his "darkest aspect", which takes separate form and attacks Kosmos in search of revenge upon the Beyonder, and it extracts and fights this part of the whole in a more than three-dimensional battle. After it defeats the Beyonder, Kubik and the original Molecule Man stop it from delivering the death blow, as this would also kill the peaceful Kosmos. Owen reabsorbs it, and as farewell, Kubik states that Owen's true self's full potential is far greater than that of his dark side.

Doc Samson stumbles upon the Molecule Man while searching for the missing Bruce Banner. Owen mistakenly thinks that he is being stalked, and captures Samson to explain himself. After She-Hulk gets involved, they clear up the misunderstanding. He reveals that his relationship with Marsha has hit a road bump, leading to temporary separation that makes him depressed. Samson convinces Owen to display his affection more openly, whereupon the latter decides to repair areas destroyed by recent terrorist activity in Marsha's honor, including rebuilding Mount Rushmore with the addition of her own likeness, which his girlfriend apparently finds touching.

2000s
The Molecule Man was listed as one of the Raft escapees after the events of The New Avengers #1.

He is one of the villains incarcerated in the Raft when the Skrulls strike.

A series of disappearances in the small town of Dinosaur, Colorado, causes Norman Osborn's "Dark Avengers" to visit the area. Sentry arrives first and is instantly disintegrated. Owen, isolated from everyone, has lost the ability to differentiate between hallucinations and reality, and secluded himself near the area he was born. After the other Avengers are defeated, Victoria Hand convinces Reece to restore everyone and everything he destroyed and to stop being a threat, in return for being left alone in the future. Sentry returns at this point, attacks the Molecule Man, and pulls him into the air, but is destroyed again. Sentry immediately reforms, and takes advantage of Owen's distraction from an incoming missile to take control of his body. Apparently unaware that Owen had already promised to do so, Sentry tells the Molecule Man to restore everything or be killed. Owen does so, but Sentry still disintegrates his body in return.

2010s
Reece's body was reformed and imprisoned by Dr. Doom, who intended to use him, as his energy frequency matched with the beacon of the Mapmakers, to oppose whatever was the origin of the Incursions and the decay of the universe. The Molecule Man took Doom elsewhere, a blank void from where they subsequently traveled backwards through the mists of time.

Doom and the Molecule Man arrived twenty-five years into the past of another universe, where they witnessed the origin of said reality's Molecule Man..The journey affected Molecule Man's mind, restoring it from its chaotic state which enables Reece to inform Doom that his accident was caused by the Beyonders, who created the Molecule Man in the first place as a singularity across every reality, to have the function of a "bomb", which would destroy its universe if he died. To prove his point the Molecule Man killed his counterpart, which set off the early death of his counterpart's universe, and is the default origin of the Incursions. The Molecule Man convinced Doom that to thwart the plans of the Beyonders, he had to embark on a mission to kill every one of the Molecule Men.

During the 2015 "Secret Wars" storyline, the nearly omnipotent Doctor Doom kept the Molecule Man in a special chamber in his castle after using him to kill the Beyonders, absorb their power, and form of his Battleworld. During the attack on Castle Doom, the two Spider-Men (Peter Parker and Miles Morales) found the chamber that the Molecule Man is in. Like every visitor before him, the Molecule Man asks if they had any food with them. Miles gives him a hamburger from his pocket, for which Reece states he is in debt to Miles. Upon learning that the Molecule Man is the source of Doom's powers, the two Spider-Men leave. Mister Fantastic and Maker (the Earth-1610 version of Mister Fantastic) enter the Molecule Man's chamber where Maker is seemingly killed by the Molecule Man while Mister Fantastic fights God Emperor Doom. To make the fight between Mister Fantastic and Doctor Doom fair, the Molecule Man depowered Doom. During the fight, Doom admits that Mister Fantastic would have done better with the godlike powers, and in response, the Molecule Man gives the power of the Beyonders to Mister Fantastic, causing Battleworld to fall apart. With his newfound omnipotence in conjunction with Franklin Richards' ability to shape entire universes, Mister Fantastic begins to reconstruct the Multiverse. As each new reality is recreated, a portion of the Molecule Man attached to it as an "anchor", which has the effect of restoring his sanity. In gratitude to Miles, the Molecule Man transfers him, his family (including his now-resurrected mother), and his friends to Earth-616, now known as The Prime Earth. Their entire life histories are merged with this new Prime Earth, and have no memory of having originated from a different universe, except the participants of the Battleworld who still have their former respective original universes' memories intact.

The Molecule Man was later seen with Mister Fantastic, Invisible Woman, Franklin Richards, Valeria Richards, and the Future Foundation on a world where he has noticed that Franklin's reality-warping capabilities are depleting. When the Griever at the End of All Things attacked, she killed the Molecule Man and had her Endlings feed off of his energies.
Following that, the Future Foundation (led by Alex Power) went on a quest to reassemble the Molecule Man's pieces, but the Maker want to steal the pieces for himself.

It was eventually revealed that Reece survived the attack from the Griever by placing all of his consciousness into one molecule and teleporting it to the Microverse.

Powers and abilities
Owen Reece originally had the ability to psionically manipulate molecules for a variety of effects, such as force field generation, energy blasts, and hyperspace travel. However, the Molecule Man later gained reality-bending capabilities on a multiversal scale.
Reece subconsciously imposed mental blocks on himself that prevented him from affecting organic molecules, which he overcame. The Molecule Man was dependent on utilizing a steel rod so he can focus his powers, but subsequently learned how to direct them without it.

Other versions

JLA/Avengers
In JLA/Avengers, the Molecule Man is seen among the enthralled villains defending Krona's stronghold. He is shown encased in stone. When Firestorm asks who did this, the Wasp tells him it was Sersi.

In other media

Television
 Molecule Man appeared in a self-titled episode of Fantastic Four, voiced by Henry Corden.
 Molecule Man appears in The Super Hero Squad Show, voiced by Fred Stoller. This version is Volcana's boyfriend and a member of Doctor Doom's Lethal Legion.
 Molecule Man makes a non-speaking appearance in the Avengers Assemble episode "Molecule Kid". He fought the Avengers and was disarmed of his wand, but his son Aaron Reece (voiced by Daryl Sabara) inherited it. In response, Nick Fury assigns Hawkeye and Black Widow to track down Aaron and confiscate the wand. After Aaron learns of them and A.I.M. coming after him, he attempts to flee, but is captured by the MODOK-controlled Super-Adaptoid. In the ensuing conflict between A.I.M. and the Avengers, the wand is accidentally broken, which also breaks reality. Despite this, Aaron is able to use the fragments to defeat the Super-Adaptoid and undo the damage with Iron Man's help before being transferred to S.H.I.E.L.D.'s custody to be put in Fury's training program for teenage superheroes.

Video games
Molecule Man appears as a playable character in Marvel Future Fight.

References

External links
 Molecule Man at Marvel.com

Characters created by Jack Kirby
Characters created by Stan Lee
Comics characters introduced in 1963
Fictional characters from Brooklyn
Fictional characters with slowed ageing
Fictional characters with nuclear or radiation abilities
Fictional characters who can manipulate reality
Fictional wandfighters
Marvel Comics Cosmic Cubes
Marvel Comics mutates
Marvel Comics supervillains